Qin Qian (born 7 December 1987) is a Chinese judoka who competed at the 2011 World Judo Championships.

References

External links
 

Living people
1987 births
Asian Games medalists in judo
Judoka at the 2010 Asian Games
Medalists at the 2010 Asian Games
Asian Games silver medalists for China
Chinese female judoka
Universiade medalists in judo
Universiade gold medalists for China
Medalists at the 2009 Summer Universiade
Medalists at the 2011 Summer Universiade
21st-century Chinese women